Verner Blaudzun (born 23 March 1946) is a Danish former cyclist who represented Denmark at the Summer Olympics. He won the bronze medal in the men's team time trial at the 1976 Montreal Olympics held in Canada, alongside Gert Frank, Jørgen Hansen and Jørn Lund.

He came fourth in the same even at the 1968 Olympics, and came 42nd 4 years later in the 1980 men's road race.

Blaudzun's son, Michael, was a professional road bicycle racer who was twice Denmark's national road racing champion and 3 times national time trial champion. He retired after the 2008 season.

The Dutch singer-songwriter and bicycle racing enthusiast Johannes Sigmond chose 'Blaudzun' as his stage name.

References

External links
 
 

1946 births
Living people
Danish male cyclists
Olympic cyclists of Denmark
Olympic bronze medalists for Denmark
Cyclists at the 1968 Summer Olympics
Cyclists at the 1976 Summer Olympics
Cyclists at the 1980 Summer Olympics
Olympic medalists in cycling
People from Sønderborg Municipality
Medalists at the 1976 Summer Olympics
Sportspeople from the Region of Southern Denmark